Datin Josephine Wong Jaw Leng Fonseka (born 1 January 1952) is a Malaysian Chinese former model and beauty pageant titleholder who was crowned Miss Malaysia Universe 1970. She represented her country at the 19th Miss Universe in Florida, United States where she was placed as one of the Top 15 semifinalists.

Personal life 
From the age of 10, Wong started to participate in various pageants as a teenager. She also attended college and worked at three beauty companies before settling at Japanese beauty company, Kanebo. In 1975, Wong married former deputy director-general of the Health Department Datuk Dr. C.G.A. Fonseka. They have four daughters, including Malaysian model, Andrea Fonseka. 

In 2004, Wong's youngest daughter, Andrea followed her footsteps and joined Miss Universe Malaysia 2004 and also won the title.

Pageantry 

In 1969, Wong competed in various beauty pageants including Miss Technical Engineering Queen 1969, a pageant organized by The Malayan Technical Services Union of Perak Central District.

In 1970, Wong participated in the Miss Perak Universe pageant which was held on 5 April in Ipoh city, and was accompanied by six delegates. During the national competition, Wong who worked as a car dealership, 18 by that time, represented Perak once again. She gained the title of Miss Malaysia Universe 1970, beating 12 participants from other states including her sister Mary Ann Wong who was then the representative of Pahang.

Later in that year, Wong represented Malaysia in Miss Universe 1970 pageant held in Florida, where she was a top 15 semifinalist.

References

1952 births
Living people
Malaysian beauty pageant winners
Malaysian Christians
Malaysian people of Chinese descent
Miss Universe 1970 contestants
People from Ipoh
People from Perak